The Park Avenue station is an open-cut station on the Newark City Subway Line of the Newark Light Rail, located at Park Avenue east of North Fourth Street, and the first (i.e. southernmost) station located on the west side of Branch Brook Park. The station is also near two smaller parks on the opposite side of the tracks.

Transfers
New Jersey Transit buses: 41

Gallery

References

External links

 Park Avenue entrance from Google Maps Street View

Newark Light Rail stations
Railway stations in the United States opened in 1935
1935 establishments in New Jersey